Stephen Adye may refer to:

 Stephen Galway Adye (1772–1838), British Army officer
 Stephen Payne Adye (c. 1740–1794), British Army officer